Đông Giang is a rural district (huyện) of Quảng Nam province in the South Central Coast region of Vietnam. As of 2003 the district had a population of 21,191. The district covers an area of 811 km². The district capital lies at Prao.

References

Districts of Quảng Nam province